The following is a list of the MTV Europe Music Award winners and nominees for Best Swedish Act.

1990s

2000s

2010s

Local Hero Award — Sweden

See also 
 MTV Europe Music Award for Best Nordic Act

MTV Europe Music Awards
Swedish music awards
Awards established in 2005